Hades Rise is an album by the Norwegian black/thrash metal band Aura Noir. It features guest appearances by Danny Coralles (Autopsy, Abscess) and Blasphemer (ex-Mayhem). Art direction was by Carl-Michael Eide, layout by Justin Bartlett.

Track listing
"Hades Rise" – 3:26
"Gaping Grave Awaits" – 4:01
"Unleash The Demon" – 3:48
"Pestilent Streams" – 3:26
"Schitzoid Paranoid" – 2:45
"Death Mask" – 3:36
"Shadows of Death" – 5:48
"Iron Night/Torment Storm" – 5:09
"South American Death" – 3:13
"The Stalker" – 3:08

Personnel
Aura Noir
Apollyon − drums, bass, vocals, guitar
Aggressor − bass, vocals, guitar

Guest musicians
Danny Coralles − lead guitar on "Gaping Grave Awaits"
Blasphemer − lead guitars on "Iron Night/Torment Storm", "Death Mask" and "Unleash the Demon"

References

External links
Justin Bartlett's website

2008 albums
Aura Noir albums